The Thirteenth Chair is a 1937 American mystery film directed by George B. Seitz, based on the 1919 stage play by Bayard Veiller, and starring Dame May Whitty, Lewis Stone, Madge Evans, and Elissa Landi.

This was the third film adaptation of the play. There was an earlier version by director Tod Browning in 1929, with Bela Lugosi in a supporting role, and an even earlier 1919 silent film adaptation that starred Creighton Hale.

Plot
In Calcutta, India, Scotland Yard Inspector Marney (Lewis Stone) and local police Commissioner Grimshaw (Matthew Boulton)  discuss the murder of Leonard Lee as they approach the bungalow where he was stabbed in the back. Grimshaw succinctly describes the victim as “rotten”.

John Wales (Henry Daniell) is inside the supposedly locked house. Lee was his best friend. Wales proposes a séance, not to raise spirits, but to put psychological pressure on suspects. They agree, and Grimshaw calls the Governor, Sir Roscoe Crosby (Holmes Herbert), to make arrangements.

At the Governor's residence, the participants gather: the Governor and his wife, Lady Crosby (Janet Beechery); their daughter, Helen Trent (Elissa Landi) and her husband, Major Lionel Trent (Ralph Forbes); their son, Dick Crosby, (Thomas Beck) and his mother's secretary, Nell O'Neill (Madge Evans), who is secretly engaged to Dick; Dr. Mason (Charles Trowbridge); Mary Eastwood (Heather Thatcher); Professor Feringeea (Lal Chand Mehra ); Mr. Stanby (Robert Coote) and his emotionally unstable sister, Miss Stanby (Elsa Buchanan); and Wales himself.

The medium, Mme. Rosalie La Grange (May Whitty) is a grandmotherly woman with a lower-class accent. After demonstrating some tricks (floating tables and disembodied knocking), she promises that there will be no trickery tonight. When the ladies withdraw to witness a body search, she has a cryptic conversation with Nell.

Doors and windows are locked. Thirteen people sit in a circle. At Mary's suggestion, La Grange is tied to her chair, with guests' handkerchiefs. The lights go out; they all clasp hands. We hear La Grange's voice and Wales's. Wales asks repeatedly “Do you know who killed you?” and falls silent. People call to him; he does not reply. The lights come on, revealing Wales, sitting in his chair, dead from a stab wound to the heart.

Inspector Marney locks down the site. If Wales was right, he observes, someone in this room killed Leonard Lee. Someone in the room certainly killed Wales. Mason finds Nell's handkerchief on the floor, shows it to Marney and returns it to her. The knife cannot be found.

The investigation reveals many motives and dishes up some red herrings. Nell admits that La Grange is her mother. The medium is astonished to learn that this makes no difference to the Crosby family: They love Nell. Then Marney tricks Nell into admitting that she visited Lee the night he was killed. She went there to retrieve Helen's love letters. Helen denies this, and Marney plans to arrest Nell. La Grange begs him for time alone, in the dark. Weeping, she appeals to the heavens for a true message. It is the  Inspector who knocks, but the message is real, she says, pointing to the knife embedded in the ceiling.

There are no fingerprints on it, and Marney remembers Nell's handkerchief, which shows a blood spot. Her mother begs for a chance to identify the killer. They recreate the séance, with Wales' body propped up in his chair. The Inspector warns everyone to be very aware of their neighbors' hands. The action of a hand may give the murderer away. In the dark, Nell cries out that Wales is moving. The lights flash on to show Wales' upraised arm pointing to the knife in the ceiling. The Inspector asks Mason to show his hands, which are quite clean. They should not be. Dick smeared lampblack on his hand; his mother's hand is now stained.because they reached across Mason. Proof that Mason kept out of the circle, just as he did when he killed Wales. Ironic, Marney says—Wales never suspected him for a moment.

Cast
 Dame May Whitty as Mme. Rosalie La Grange
 Madge Evans as Nell O'Neill
 Lewis Stone as Inspector Marney
 Elissa Landi as Helen Trent
 Thomas Beck as Dick Crosby
 Henry Daniell as John Wales
 Janet Beecher as Lady Crosby
 Ralph Forbes as Lionel Trent
 Holmes Herbert as Sir Roscoe Crosby
 Heather Thatcher as Mary Eastwood
 Charles Trowbridge as Dr. Mason
 Robert Coote as Stanby
 Elsa Buchanan as Grace Stanby
 Lal Chand Mehra as Professor Feringeea
 Neil Fitzgerald as Constable
 Louis Vincenot as Chotee
 Matthew Boulton as Commissioner Grimshaw

References

External links
 The Thirteenth Chair in the Internet Movie Database
 
 
 

1937 films
Films directed by George B. Seitz
Remakes of American films
Metro-Goldwyn-Mayer films
1937 drama films
American drama films
American black-and-white films
Films set in India
1930s English-language films
1930s American films